Wilhelm Breckvelt, or Breekvelt (1658 – 1687, Düsseldorf), was a Dutch Golden Age painter.

Biography
According to Houbraken he married Adriana Spilberg, who had many suitors, but her father would only marry her to another painter.
Adriana had 3 sons by him, but he died young at 29 only 3 years after they married.

According to the RKD he is known for a signed drawing in the university library of Leiden. He is registered in Düsseldorf in 1658-1687.

References

1658 births
1687 deaths
Dutch Golden Age painters
Dutch male painters
Artists from Düsseldorf